Big Suspicious is the first full-length studio album from American rock trio band Wild Adriatic released in 2014. It was funded through fan support through PledgeMusic, reaching its goal of $11,000 on December 3, 2013. It has generated two official music videos for Lonely and Mess Around.

History
The band recorded the album while living together for several weeks in a studio in Argyle, New York. The band chose to self-record the album, with Gray engineering and mixing the songs. The official CD release party took place January 18 in Albany, NY. The performance was filmed for an as of yet unreleased live DVD.

Critical reception
Big Suspicious has been called 'vintage' rock with its "meaty guitar riffs, organ, tambourine and cowbell. Soaring vocals, infectious hooks. This is the stuff that was designed to move a party and still does."

Track listing
All songs written, performed, and produced by Wild Adriatic.

Credits
Wild Adriatic
 Travis Gray - vocals, lead guitar
 Rich Derbyshire - bass
 Mateo Vosganian - drums

Additional Musicians
 Scott Hannay - Keyboard - Tracks 1 through 10
 Dan Maddalone - Trombone - Tracks 2, 3 & 11
 Chris Weatherly - Trumpet - Tracks 2, 3 & 11
 Dylan Sorensen - Saxophone - Tracks 2, 3, & 11
 Meghan Gray - Backup Vocals - Track 2
 Maggie Goble - Backup Vocals - Track 11
 Pat Daley, Rich Derbyshire, Maggie Goble, Rebecca Grat, Mike Ingignoli, Jacob Lavine, Shima Miabadi, Jeff Morad, Kim Neaton, Adam Patten, Jacob Schmiel, Mateo Vosganian, Chuck Vosganian, and Mallory Wright/Morad - Group Vocals - Track 12

Other Credits
 Assistant Engineer - Jacon Lavin
 Recorded and Mixed - Travis Gray
 Mastered by Alan Douches at West West Side
 Drum Tech - Thomas Alberto Elefante

References

2014 albums
Wild Adriatic albums